L-Alpha glycerylphosphorylcholine (alpha-GPC, choline alfoscerate) is a natural choline compound found in the brain. It is also a parasympathomimetic acetylcholine precursor which has been investigated for its potential for the treatment of Alzheimer's disease and other dementias.

Alpha-GPC rapidly delivers choline to the brain across the blood–brain barrier and is a biosynthetic precursor of acetylcholine. It is a non-prescription drug in most countries. The FDA determined that intake of no more than 196.2 mg/person/day is considered generally recognized as safe (GRAS).

Production 
Industrially, alpha-GPC is produced by the chemical or enzymatic deacylation of phosphatidylcholine enriched soya phospholipids followed by chromatographic purification. Alpha-GPC may also be derived in small amounts from highly purified soy lecithin as well as from purified sunflower lecithin.

References

External links 
 Alpha-GPC on PsychonautWiki

Cholinergics
Dietary supplements
Nutrition
Vitamins
Neuropharmacology
Glycerol esters